Gadd is a surname. Notable people with the surname include:

 Anthony Gadd (1917–1996), British bobsledder
 C. J. Gadd (1893–1969), British Assyriologist and curator
 Christianne Gadd, former name of actress Christianne Oliveira (born 1971)
 Geoffrey Michael Gadd (born 1954), British-Irish microbiologist and mycologist 
 Hemming Gadd (1837–1915), Swedish Army general
 Hugo Gadd (1885–1968), Swedish Army major general
 Knut Gadd (1916–1995), Swedish water polo player
 Paul Francis Gadd (born 1944), the real name of British pop singer and convicted paedophile Gary Glitter
 Renee Gadd (1908–2003), Argentine-born British film actress
 Stephen Gadd (born 1964), English operatic baritone
 Steve Gadd (born 1945), American drummer
 Steve Gadd (born 1951), English vocalist (Stray (band))
 Trevor Gadd (born 1952), English athlete
 Will Gadd, Canadian ice climber and paraglider pilot

Fictional characters:
  Elvin Gadd, fictional character